James Johnston Clark (1809 – June 1891) was a Unionist politician in Ireland.

Clark was born the son of Alexander and Margaret (née Johnston) Clark of Maghera. He inherited Largantogher House, Maghera, County Londonderry on the death of his father in 1842 and was appointed High Sheriff of County Londonderry for 1849.

He served as a Unionist Member of Parliament for County Londonderry from 9 March 1857 until 1859.  He was a member of the Carlton Club, London.

He married Frances, the daughter of Robert Hall of Merton Hall, Tipperary. His son, Sir William Ovens Clark, was Chief Justice of Punjab Chief Court. Clark's grandson was James Lenox-Conyngham Chichester-Clark and his great-grandson was Prime Minister of Northern Ireland, Lord Moyola.  He was the father-in-law of John Kells Ingram.

Arms

References

External links 

1809 births
1891 deaths
High Sheriffs of County Londonderry
Deputy Lieutenants of Londonderry
Members of the Parliament of the United Kingdom for County Londonderry constituencies (1801–1922)
People from Maghera
UK MPs 1857–1859